Giam Ping Leong, better known as Yan Bingliang, is a Singaporean actor best known for acting in many Chinese-language television series produced by Mediacorp Channel 8. A veteran actor, he entered the entertainment industry in 1984 after finishing Singapore Broadcasting Corporation's 5th drama training course. He is known by his own generation for his role in Neighbours, the longest running drama in SBC/TCS/MediaCorp history, and for portraying antagonists or villains. He left Mediacorp in 2011 and is now working as a freelance artist, films director/producer, scriptwriter, acting course trainer and a real estate agent.

Filmography

References

External links
Profile on xin.msn.com

Singaporean male television actors
Singaporean people of Chinese descent